Georgeana azurea is a species of beetle in the family Cerambycidae, the only species in the genus Georgeana.

References

Acanthocinini